Radek Voltr (born 28 November 1991) is a Czech football player who currently plays for Viktoria Žižkov.

Career
After a half season on loan at 1. FK Příbram, Voltr signed permanently for the club on 16 January 2019.

References

External links

1991 births
Living people
Sportspeople from Hradec Králové
Czech footballers
Czech Republic youth international footballers
Czech First League players
FC Hradec Králové players
FK Čáslav players
FK Viktoria Žižkov players
SK Slavia Prague players
FC Vysočina Jihlava players
MFK Karviná players
1. FK Příbram players
Association football forwards
Czech National Football League players
FC Slovan Liberec players
Bohemian Football League players